The Scavenius Cabinet was the government of Denmark from 9 November 1942 to 5 May 1945. It replaced the Buhl I Cabinet, which fell due to the Telegram Crisis in November 1942, when the Germans demanded changes to the Danish government. The Germans wanted nonpolitical ministers and Nazi ministers in the new government, however only the first demand was met. 
Following the August Rebellion in 1943, the Germans put forward more demands, which the Danish authorities refused. The government therefore filed a resignation request for the King on 29 August 1943, who refused to accept it. The government de facto ceased to function, though still formally in power. The  was established, where the ministries and directors of the ministries managed the country. Only after the liberation of 5 May 1945, were the resignation accepted, and the Scavenius Cabinet and Board of the Heads of Department were replaced by the Buhl II Cabinet.

List of ministers and portfolios
Some of the terms in the table begin before after 9 November 1942 because the minister was in the Stauning VI Cabinet as well.

References

1942 establishments in Denmark
1945 disestablishments in Denmark
Scavenius